Gemma Houghton (born 31 December 1993) is an Australian rules footballer playing for the Port Adelaide Football Club in the AFL Women's competition. Houghton was recruited by Fremantle as a free agent in October 2016. She had never played AFL before, having been found through a talent search open to all athletes. She previously played high level basketball. 

She played every match in her debut season to finish with seven matches.

Playing for the Swan Districts Football Club in the 2018 WAFL Women's competition, Houghton won the Mandy McSherry Medal, the teams best and fairest award.

After only playing two games in 2018, Houghton played in all eight of Fremantle's games in 2019, kicking 9 goals to be the club's leading goalkicker. Her athleticism and strong marking was recognised with selection in the 2019 and 2020 AFL Women's All-Australian teams. The 2020 AFL Women's season saw Houghton obtain her second AFL Women's All-Australian team selection, named in the half forward position.

Her brother Joel Houghton was drafted by Fremantle in the 2009 AFL draft, but did not play an AFL game. He played for Perth, Swan Districts and East Perth in the West Australian Football League (WAFL).

On 10th of May, 2022, Houghton signed with expansion club  for AFL Women's season seven and scored their inaugural goal in Round 1.

Statistics
Statistics are correct to the end of the 2021 season.

|- style=background:#EAEAEA
| scope=row | 2017 ||  || 27
| 7 || 3 || 5 || 36 || 26 || 62 || 11 || 28 || 0.4 || 0.7 || 5.1 || 3.7 || 8.9 || 1.6 || 4.0 || 0
|-
| scope=row | 2018||  || 27
| 2 || 0 || 0 || 4 || 0 || 4 || 3 || 4 || 0.0 || 0.0 || 2.0 || 0.0 || 2.0 || 1.5 || 2.0 || 0
|- style=background:#EAEAEA
| scope=row | 2019 ||  || 27
| 8 || 9 || 8 || 51 || 22 || 73 || 25 || 35 || 1.1 || 1.0 || 6.4 || 2.8 || 9.1 || 3.1 || 4.4 || 3
|-
| scope=row | 2020 ||  || 27
| 7 || 4 || 10 || 54 || 24 || 78 || 26 || 20 || 0.6 || 1.4 || 7.7 || 3.4 || 11.1 || 3.7 || 2.9 || 2
|- style=background:#EAEAEA
| scope=row | 2021 ||  || 27
| 10 || 15 || 8 || 73 || 35 || 108 || 27 || 26 || 1.5 || 0.8 || 7.3 || 3.5 || 10.8 || 2.7 || 2.6 || 8
|- class=sortbottom
! colspan=3 | Career
! 34 !! 31 !! 31 !! 218 !! 107 !! 325 !! 92 !! 113 !! 0.9 !! 0.9 !! 6.4 !! 3.1 !! 9.6 !! 2.7 !! 3.3 !! 13
|}

References

External links 

Gemma Houghton on Instagram

1993 births
Living people
Fremantle Football Club (AFLW) players
Port Adelaide Football Club (AFLW) players
Australian rules footballers from Western Australia
Indigenous Australian players of Australian rules football
All-Australians (AFL Women's)